Rita Marie Grigorian (born 17 October 2000) is an American-born Armenian footballer who plays as a forward for the Armenia women's national team.

Early life
Grigorian was raised in Glendale, California.

High school career
Grigorian has attended the Glendale High School in her hometown.

International career
Grigorian made her senior debut for Armenia on 8 April 2021 as a 67th-minute substitution in a 2–0 friendly home win over Lebanon.

References

External links

2000 births
Living people
Citizens of Armenia through descent
Armenian women's footballers
Women's association football forwards
Armenia women's international footballers
Sportspeople from Glendale, California
Soccer players from California
American women's soccer players
American people of Armenian descent
21st-century American women